Agrarian Party is the name of several political parties:

Current political parties
Environmentalist Agrarian Party, Albania
Agrarian Party of Belarus
Agrarian Party of Kazakhstan
Agrarian Party of Moldova, from 1991 to 1998
Agrarian Party (Norway)
Agrarian Party (Panama), in Chiriqui Province in the 1920s and 1940s
Spanish Agrarian Party, during the Second Republic, known as the Agrarian Party (Partido Agrario) until 1934
Agrarian Party (Tajikistan)
Agrarian Party of Ukraine

Former political parties
Bulgarian Agrarian National Union, Bulgaria (1899–1946)
Chilean Agrarian Party (1931–1945), a political party in Chile, formed in 1931 and dissolved in 1945 to form the Agrarian Labor Party
Agrarian Labor Party, Chile (1945–1958)
Republican Party of Farmers and Peasants, also known as the Agrarian Party of Czechoslovakia (1899–1938)
Agrarian Party (Czech Republic), (1990–2007)
Finnish Agrarian Party, Finland (1959–1995)
Agrarian Party (Hungary)
Agrarian Party (Italy)
Agrarian Party of Russia, Russia (1993–2008)
Agrarian Party of Yugoslavia, Yugoslavia (pre-1945)

See also
Agrarian (disambiguation)
Farmers' Party (disambiguation)
 Agrarianism, as a political ideology, has however been the basis for many more parties
 Peasants' Party (disambiguation), a name also used by agrarian parties, but not limited to them
 List of agrarian parties